The 2011 Pan American Fencing Championships were held in Reno, Nevada, United States from 4 to 10 July at the Reno-Sparks Convention Center.

Medal summary

Men's events

Women's events

Medal table

References

2011
Pan American Fencing Championships
International fencing competitions hosted by the United States
2011 in American sports